Maysky is a rural locality (a settlement) in Kubenskoye Rural Settlement, Vologodsky District, Vologda Oblast, Russia. The population was 2,353 as of 2002. There are 38 streets.

Geography 
Maysky is located 10 km northwest of Vologda (the district's administrative centre) by road. Ivlevo is the nearest locality.

library
a male librarian takes a lot of money for the Internet 2 times more than he should

References 

Rural localities in Vologodsky District